The Bereznegovatoye–Snigirevka offensive was an offensive on the Eastern Front of World War II by the Red Army's 3rd Ukrainian Front against the German 6th Army in the area to the east of Mykolaiv in southern Ukraine between 6 and 18 March 1944. It was part of the wider Dnieper–Carpathian offensive. The offensive was named after the two settlements around which the fighting was centered: Bereznegovatoye and Snigirevka.

Background 
After the German 6th Army had given up its last eastern Dniepr bridgehead at Nikopol and had been beaten in the Nikopol–Krivoi Rog offensive in February 1944, it retreated behind the Inhulets River. The High Command of the Wehrmacht decided to use this river as a defensive line. On the night of March 3, the 8th Guards Army launched a surprise attack and reached the opposite bank, west of Shyroke. Based on this success, the commander of the 3rd Ukrainian Front, Army General Rodion Malinovsky, decided to make a front breakthrough via Novyi Buh with the 8th Guards Army and the 46th Army. Lieutenant General Issa Pliyev and his Cavalry mechanized group was to proceed via Novyi Buh in the rear of the German front and cut off all enemy units in the area east of Nikolayev.

The Battle 
The Soviet attack began on the morning of March 6, 1944. The 23rd Tank Corps, with 102 tanks and 16 self-propelled guns under command of General Pushkin, of the Soviet 46th Army (Lieutenant General Vasily Glagolev) was to spearhead the attack. In support was the Cavalry Mechanized Group Pliyev, consting of the 4th Guards Mechanized Corps (under Lieutenant General Trofim Tanaschishin with 100 tanks and 23 self-propelled guns) and the 4th Guards Cavalry Corps. It was not until the evening of the first day of the attack that the Cavalry Mechanized Group Pliyev joined the operation.

Pliyev's troops invaded Novyi Buh from several directions despite bad weather conditions on the morning of March 8: parts of the 9th Guards Cavalry Division (Major General Tutarinov) from the East, the 4th Guards Mechanized Corps and the 30th Cavalry Division (Major General Golovskoj) from the south and southwest. The railway line Dolynska - Nikolayev was interrupted, cutting the front of the German 6th Army in two.

Troops of the Soviet 6th Army (Lieutenant-General Ivan Shlemin), the 5th Shock Army (General Vyacheslav Tsvetayev) and the 28th Army (Lieutenant-General Aleksei Grechkin), deployed on the southern wing, simultaneously carried out attacks on the right wing (LXXII and XXXXIV Army Corps) of the 6th Army.

On March 11 and 12, the 49th Guards Rifle Division (Colonel Vasily Margelov) and the 295th Rifle Division (Colonel Alexander Dorofeyev) of the 28th Army, crossed the Dniepr at Kakhovka and set up bridgeheads on the other bank. On March 11, Beryslav fell into Soviet hands and on March 13, the important port city of Kherson was liberated.

In the northern section, part of the Cavalry Mechanized Group Pliyev had turned south on the evening of 9 March, freeing Bashtanka after fierce fighting, and advancing further south. On March 13, the Soviet troops approached Snigirevka. As a result, about 13 divisions (XVII., XXXXIV., LII. And IV. Army Corps) of the German 6th Army were briefly encircled. However, the cavalry group Pliyev itself was not strong enough to form a solid front in the west. The mass of the 8th Guards Army was still fighting in the Baschtanka and Vladimirovka area against the German XXIX. Army Corps. The 37th Rifle Corps (Maj. Gen. Sergei F. Gorochov) of the 5th Shock Army, advancing from the east on Snigirevka, was still too far to help in the encirclement.

On March 13, the 6th Army commander Colonel-General Karl-Adolf Hollidt ordered the trapped troops to immediately break out to the west. Almost all the artillery and equipment had to be abandoned. The 370th, 304th, 335th and 9th Infantry Divisions suffered particularly heavy losses. On March 15, Bereznegovatoye and Snigirevka were liberated by Soviet troops.
The German troops withdrew behind the Southern Bug River. Meanwhile, the 57th and 37th Army had successfully operated on the right wing of the 3rd Ukrainian Front. During the pursuit of the retreating enemy, the Dolynska Railway Junction was occupied on 12 March, and the Bobrynets Road Junction on 16 March.

During the night of March 18 to 19, 1944, the 394th Rifle Division of the 46th Army had crossed the Southern Bug and was able to form a bridgehead on the western bank. To the left, the 8th Guards Army reached the western bank of the river south of Nova Odesa and prepared the attack on Odessa.
Only on March 24, the 37th Army was able to free the city of Voznesensk and create another bridgehead on the western bank of the Southern Bug River.

Result 
Within 13 days, the 3rd Ukrainian Front had managed to decisively beat the 6th Army. A very large Soviet territory (more than 20,000 km2), between the Inhulets and Southern Bug Rivers was liberated. The 125th Infantry Division was completely destroyed and dissolved by the High Command of the Wehrmacht. The 16th Panzer Grenadier Division lost two thirds of its strength, the 9th Panzer Division, the 15th, the 294th, the 302st, the 304th and the 335th Infantry Divisions lost 50% of their strength and almost all their heavy material. 13,700 German soldiers and officers were captured. Colonel-General Hollidt was replaced as Commander-in-Chief of the 6th Army at the end of March 1944. For the Soviet Union, favorable conditions had been created for the liberation of the Crimea.

Sources 
 This is a translation of the article in the German Wikipedia, Beresnegowatoje-Snigirjower Operation.''
 Map of the Operation

Bibliography 
 
 
 
 
 

Conflicts in 1944
History of Mykolaiv Oblast
Military operations of World War II involving Germany
Battles and operations of the Soviet–German War
Military history of Ukraine
1944 in Ukraine
March 1944 events